Thomas Ancora (born 20 July 1986 as Thomas Quagliara Ancora) is a Belgian actor, movie director and script screen writer appearing in films, television and on stage. He has also been a TV/Radio host and presented radio and television shows for various Belgian stations (Club RTL, Plug RTL et RTL TVI) between 2006 and 2011. He is represented by the French agency VMA.

Life and career 
Ancora started acting classes at the age of 8 and was spotted by a modeling agency New Models when he was 15. Two years later, he got his first big role with the French TV show Ma terminale where he played role of "Kevin". The show aired in 2004 on M6 and Plug RTL. His cinema debuted in 2006, with Mes copines, followed by the Disney television series Tom et Nancy airing on Club RTL (Belgium) for three seasons. After a few short movies, guest appearances in TV shows (Clash, Le Kot, Strictement platonique), films (Sans laisser de traces, Nuit blanche, Ludo, The Fifth Estate), webseries (Ce que disent les Bruxellois, Les JOC that he created and directed) and appearances at the Magritte du cinéma award ceremonies followed. He is currently on the French TV show Clem where he plays "Paul" since season 3.

In 2017, he joins the cast of the mini TV serie "La guerre des as" on Arte to portray WW1 hero Mick Mannock and the French TV serie "Remember", next to Marie Gillain.

Ancora also started writing a few years ago. After doing a few webseries and videos for the Les magritte du cinéma, he wrote the movie "Losers Revolution" (that he co directed with Grégory Béghin in 2019)  where he played next to Clément Manuel, Kody Kim, Bapstiste Sornin and Tania Garbarski.
He is currently working on his second feature film while still working as an actor on various films and series.

Filmography

Actor 
Cinema
2006: Girlfriends by Sylvie Ayme
2007: Memory of Power, short by Angie Russo
2010: Sans laisser de traces by Grégoire Vigneron
2010: Fais ton choix, short film by Stéphane Henocque
2011: Nuit blanche, English title Sleepless Night by Frédéric Jardin
2011: Le Couloir, short film by Adrien François
2013: Ludo by Khourban Cassam-Chenaï
2013: The Fifth Estate by Bill Condon
2014: Insoupçonnable short film by Sidney Van Wichelen
2015: Made in Belgium by Hugues Hausman
2015: Une Nuit (One Night) by Alexandra Billington
2017: Where hands touch by Amma Asante
2018: Budapest by Xavier Gens
2020: 
2021: L'employée du mois 
2021: Summit fever 

Television
2004:  as Kevin - (season 1, M6)
2006–2009 : Tom et Nancy as Tom - (three seasons, Club RTL)
2010:  as Taddeo (France 2)
2010: Le Kot (MTV)
2011: Aspra balonia - in Greek: Άσπρα Μπαλόνια (Sigma)
2012:  as Juan (France 2)
2012-2016: Clem as Paul (TF1)
2013: Ce que disent les gens du cinéma belge (video aired during the Magritte du cinéma) - Be TV
2014: I'm Gonna get a Magritte (Music Video aired during Magritte du cinéma) - Be TV
2015: Ainsi soient-ils (Season 3) - Arte
2017: La forêt (Season 1) - France 3
2017:  (Season 1) - M6
2018: Papa ou maman - M6
2018:  as Edward Mannock - Arte
2021: Baraki as Bernard Pirotte - RTBF
2021: Familie as Stieg - VRT
2022: 1985 as Marcel Barbier - RTBF VRT

Theatre
2003: Jeux de massacre by Eugène Ionesco
2009: Le Misanthrope by Molière, Director: Fabrice Cecchi
2010: Les Coucous by Guy Grosso and Michel Modo, Director: Jean-Paul Andret
2011:  by Marc-Gilbert Sauvajon, Director: Jean-Paul Andret

Web
2012 - 2013 : Ce que dissent les Bruxellois
2012 : Les JOC
2015 : Arrête ton cinéma!

Scenarist 
2012: Ce que disent les Bruxellois (web-série)
2013: "Ce que disent les gens du cinéma belge" (vidéo diffusée lors de la cérémonie des Magritte du cinéma )
2014: "I'm Gonna get a Magritte" (Music video aired during the "Magritte du cinéma" )
2015 : Arrête ton cinéma!
2020: Losers Revolution
2022: Culte (in development)

Director 
Cinema

2020: Losers Revolution
2022: Culte (in development)

References

External links

1986 births
Living people
Belgian male film actors
Belgian male stage actors
Belgian male television actors
People from Frameries
21st-century Belgian male actors
Belgian television presenters